Joseph Andrews is a 1742 comic romance by Henry Fielding.

Joseph Andrews may also refer to:

Joseph Andrews (film), a 1977 British film based on the novel
Joseph Andrews (Australian politician) (1814–1901), New South Wales politician, 1880–1882
Joseph Andrews (British politician) (1870–1909), British Liberal Member of Parliament, 1905–1906
Joseph Andrews House, a historic house in Waltham, Massachusetts

See also
Joseph Andrew (disambiguation)

Andrews, Joseph